Porsuk railway station is a railway station near the village of Kargın in the Eskişehir Province. Due to its remote location, the station mainly serves as a siding to allow trains to pass one another. Porsuk station consists of two side platforms with three tracks. TCDD Taşımacılık operates two daily intercity trains to İzmir and Denizli, as well as three daily regional trains to Tavşanlı, Kütahya and Afyonkarahisar.

References

External links
Porsuk timetable
TCDD Taşımacılık

Railway stations in Eskişehir Province